Gordana Grubin (Serbian Cyrillic:Гордана Грубин, born August 20, 1972 in Zrenjanin, SFR Yugoslavia) is a former Serbian professional basketball player who played in Europe and the United States.

WNBA career
Grubin played six seasons in WNBA for the Los Angeles Sparks, Indiana Fever, Phoenix Mercury and Houston Comets.

In the 1999 WNBA season she ranked fifth in three-point percentage. Gordana became first Indiana Fever player in their franchise history. She was selected as the first pick of the 2000 WNBA Expansion Draft.

European career
 MVP of National championship of Yugoslavia 1997
 Winner of Hungarian Cup 1999
 Winner of European Fiba Cup 1999/2000 with Basket Parma
 Elected the best foreign player of Italian Championship 1999/2000
 Winner of Italian Cup and Italian Championship 2000/2001
 Winner of Polish Cup and Polish Championship 2001/2002  and 2002/2003
 Finalist Fiba Europe Eurolegaue 2002
 Finalist of Italian Championship 2003/2004
 The Best scorer of Euroleague 2003/2004
 Winner of Supercup with Schio 2004
 Winner of 2006 EuroCup Women with Spartak Moscow

Awards
In 2002 voted from Gazzetta dello Sport 6th best basketball player of Europe.

National team
Grubin played for the Serbian national team at the 1999 and 2003 Eurobasket.

See also 
 List of Serbian WNBA players

References

External links
WNBA.com Profile
WNBA stats at basketball-reference.com
FIBA profile

1972 births
Living people
Sportspeople from Zrenjanin
Serbian women's basketball players
Shooting guards
Serbian expatriate basketball people in the United States
Houston Comets players
Indiana Fever players
Los Angeles Sparks players
Phoenix Mercury players
ŽKK Vršac players
ŽKK Vojvodina players
Women's National Basketball Association players from Serbia